National Theatre Wales (NTW) is a theatre company known for its large-scale site-specific productions and its grassroots work with diverse Welsh communities. It is the English-language national theatre of Wales, and refers to Theatr Genedlaethol Cymru, the Welsh-language national theatre of Wales founded in 2003, as its sister company. 

NTW's current artistic director is Lorne Campbell, and its executive producer is Lisa Maguire. Its previous artistic directors are John E. McGrath and Kully Thiarai.

Notable productions
Among the company’s productions are:

 The Persians (2010) by Kaite O’Reilly, Mike Pearson and Mike Brookes. A reimagining of one of Europe’s earliest recorded plays on a military training range in the Brecon Beacons, which won the 2010 Ted Hughes Award.
 The Passion (2011). A 72-hour secular passion play created by Michael Sheen, which won the UK Theatre Award for Best Director.
 The Radicalisation of Bradley Manning (2012) by Tim Price. A fictionalised account of whistleblower Chelsea Manning’s teenage years in Pembrokeshire, which won the 2013 James Tait Black Prize for Drama.
 CORIOLAN/US (2012) by Mike Pearson and Mike Brookes. A multimedia reimagining of Coriolanus in a World War II aircraft hangar in St Athan, produced with the Royal Shakespeare Company as part of the World Shakespeare Festival.
 In Water I’m Weightless (2012) by Kaite O’Reilly. A provocative exploration of disability and the human body combining movement and live projections, co-produced with Unlimited for the London 2012 Festival.
 De Gabay (2013). An immersive production created by a group of young Welsh-Somali performers in Butetown, Cardiff, which was shortlisted for a Gulbenkian award.
 Mametz (2014) by Owen Sheers. Play commissioned as part of 14-18 NOW, which transformed an ancient woodland near Usk, Monmouthshire into the trenches and battlefields of the Somme.
 The Gathering/Yr Helfa (2014) by National Poet of Wales, Gillian Clarke, and Louise Ann Wilson. An exploration of the annual cycle of sheep-farming on a working hill farm on Snowdon.
 Bordergame (2014). An interactive production exploring migration and contemporary border regimes, which won the first Space Prize for Digital Innovation.
 Roald Dahl’s City of the Unexpected (2016). A Cardiff-wide celebration of Roald Dahl with 7,000 people performing, making and volunteering, billed as “Wales’ largest-ever cultural event.”
 We’re Still Here (2017) by Rachel Trezise and the people of Port Talbot. A co-production with Common Wealth Theatre sited in a disused steelworks which won a 2018 Nesta/The Observer New Radicals Award.
 NHS70 (2018). A season of one-person plays celebrating the NHS taking place in intimate settings all over Wales, including new work by Maria Fusco, Alan Harris and Elis James.
 Tide Whisperer (2018) by Louise Wallwein. An acclaimed immersive production on the shores of Tenby tackling the global phenomenon of displacement and mass movement.
 On Bear Ridge (2019) by Ed Thomas. A co-production with Royal Court Theatre which was named one of the U.K.’s five best new plays of 2019 by The Stage.
 Refrain (2019) by Sean Edwards. A radio play produced with Wrexham’s Tŷ Pawb as part of the Wales in Venice presentation at the 58th Venice Biennale.
 Mission Control (2019). A fantasy musical co-produced with Hijinx Theatre and created with Seiriol Davies, staged at the Millennium Stadium.

References

External links 
Reviews of Productions Since 2010 at:   http://www.theatre-wales.co.uk/reviews/reviews_details.asp?reviewID=5133

Articles on National Theatre Wales Since 1995  http://www.theatre-wales.co.uk/reviews/reviews_details.asp?reviewID=3708

National Theatre Wales Community

Wales
Theatre companies in Wales